Edouard de Jans (16 April 1855, in Sint-Andries – 11 July 1919, in Antwerp) was a Flemish portrait and genre painter.

Biography 
His father was a farmer and miller. It is said that he first became interested in art when he saw a display in the window of a lithographer's shop. His talent was noticed at school, but came to little until a local aristocrat asked Jans to make drawings of a castle, "Steentien", which he was restoring. He was sufficiently impressed to offer Jans a chance to study at the local art school (the ). In his first year, he received orders for drawings from the Mayor and other notables. By 1873, he was a teacher at the Bogardenschool.

Two years later, he was accepted at the Royal Academy of Fine Arts (Antwerp) and placed in the Master Class, where his instructor was Nicaise De Keyser. He also studied genre painting with Polydore Beaufaux and Charles Verlat. Although he specialized in portraits, he also did Biblical scenes, history paintings and landscapes.

In 1876, he received a scholarship from the Prix de Rome for his painting "Return of the Prodigal Son", which enabled him to travel throughout Europe, visiting France, Italy, Germany and Austria. When he returned to Antwerp in 1889, he was appointed a Professor at the Academy and held that position until his death.

A street in Bruges is named after him. His daughter Luisa (1884-1968) also became a painter.

References

Further reading
 R. De Laere, De herdenking Eduard de Jans te Sint-Andries, 16 juni 1935 (Memorial), Kroniek van Sint-Andries, Neptunus n.v. Schoonbaert, Bruges, #92, 10 October 1996, Vol.23, pg.3
 Jaak Rau, Sint-Andries: geschiedenis van de Brugse rand Brugge, Marc Van de Wiele, Bruges (1991)
 Martha Van Coppenolle, Eduard de Jans, herdacht 16 juni 1935 (Commemoration), Bruges,1935, 40 pgs.

External links

 ArtNet: More paintings by Edouard de Jans

1855 births
1919 deaths
Portrait painters
19th-century Belgian painters
19th-century Belgian male artists
20th-century Belgian painters
Artists from Bruges
20th-century Belgian male artists